Casein kinase II subunit alpha' is an enzyme that in humans is encoded by the CSNK2A2 gene.

Interactions
CSNK2A2 has been shown to interact with over 160 different substrates.

CSNK2A2 has been shown to interact with:

 Activating transcription factor 2, 
 ATF1,
 C-Fos,
 CREB binding protein, 
 CSNK2B,
 FGF1, 
 Nucleolin,
 PIN1,
 PTEN, and
 RELA.

References

External links

Further reading